Nesting is a 2012 American romantic comedy film written and directed by John Chuldenko and starring Todd Grinnell and Ali Hillis. The film premiered at the 2012 Cleveland Film Festival.

Cast
Todd Grinnell as Neil
Ali Hillis as Sarah
Kevin Linehan as Graham
Erin Chambers as Katie
Alexi Wasser as Rachel
Jeffrey Stubblefield as Jeff
Sorel Carradine as Nikki
Erik Stocklin as Ben
Wes Armstrong as Kenny
Jeremy Radin as Ross
Jamal Thomas as Brian
Erin Gray as Mrs. Deegan

Release
The film had a limited release on May 11, 2012.

Reception
The film has a 0% rating on Rotten Tomatoes based on nine reviews.

Kalvin Henely of Slant Magazine awarded the film one star out of four and wrote, "The way Nesting goes out of its way to tell us where it’s set is symptomatic of the film in general."

Dennis Harvey of Variety gave the film a negative review and wrote, "The script unfortunately suffers from its own case of arrested development, barely getting out of the gate before stalling, and never building enough laughs or narrative impetus to justify feature length."

References

External links
 
 

2012 films
2012 romantic comedy films
American romantic comedy films
2010s English-language films
2010s American films